The New Worst Witch is a television series, based on Jill Murphy's The Worst Witch books, about a group of young witches at a Witch Academy. It ran for two series from 2005 to 2007. The series was a spin-off from The Worst Witch TV series that ran from 1998 to 2001.

The series followed Henrietta "Hettie" Hubble (Mildred's younger cousin), through her years at Cackle's Academy. Mildred is seen at the start of the first episode accompanying her cousin to Cackle's, before returning home flawlessly on her broom. Hettie quickly becomes best friends with Mona Hallow (who happens to be Ethel's younger sister) and Crescentmoon "Cressie" Winterchild. Hettie and her friends' new enemy is Belladonna Bindweed and her sidekick Cynthia Horrocks. Miss Hardbroom and Miss Cackle return, and are joined by new members of staff Caspian Bloom, Miss Swoop and Miss Widget/Miss Nightingale.

The New Worst Witch was initially planned to have a third season in 2007, however Alice Connor who played Henrietta Hubble in the series along with several other cast members decided not to sign onto the third season and thus was subsequently canceled the same year.

During November 2009, CITV showed all episodes of The New Worst Witch.

Characters
 Henrietta "Hettie" Hubble – The younger cousin of Mildred Hubble. Hettie is the main protagonist of the series and is very similar in attitude and personality to Mildred. She makes friends with Mona Hallow and Crescentmoon "Cressie" Winterchild and is sort-of-friends with Dyllis Mustardseed. She is also enemies with Belladonna Bindweed and Cynthia Horrocks. Hettie is played by Alice Connor.
 Mona Hallow – The younger sister of Ethel Hallow and Sybil Hallow. She is friendly and enjoys science. She meets Hettie in the first episode when Hettie accidentally stands on her magnifying glass. Mona is friends with Hettie and Cressie and shares a mutual hatred with Belladonna Bindweed and especially Cynthia Horrocks. Mona is played by Anabel Barnston.
 Crescentmoon "Cressie" Winterchild – A witch student with a Liverpool accent and a member of the Hedge Witch Community. Cressie takes pride in being a member of the Hedge Witch Community, as shown in the episode "The Bewitching of Mona Hallow" where she and Hettie celebrate Hazelmass behind Miss Cackle's back and in the episode "Mr Perky Pentangle" where she helps Mona do a Hedge Witch dance for Miss Widget's "Uniquely You" project. In the final episode "The Odd Couple" Hettie accidentally turns her into a baby. Cressie is played by Paislie Reid.
 Belladonna Bindweed – The stuck-up, conniving and nasty rival/enemy of Hettie, Mona and Cressie. She is the granddaughter of Betty Bindweed, one of Agatha Cackle's henchwomen who try to take over the school in the final episode of the first series "The Enemy Within". Belladonna gives a teacher's pet-style impression to Miss Hardbroom. Belladonna sometimes shows symptoms of being a stereotypical dumb blonde such as in the episode "Mr Perky Pentangle" she mistook her mirror for the letter O, a chair for the letter H and Cynthia Horrocks herself as the letter I after Caspian Bloom made her short-sighted after Belladonna called him blind. It is hinted that Belladonna fancies Miss Hardbroom's nephew Artemis. Played by Francesca Isherwood.
 Cynthia Horrocks – The equally stuck-up, snotty sidekick of Belladonna, who she only hangs out with due to her lack of friends. She comes to Cackle's under a charity scholarship after being forced to leave Pentangle's after Mr Hallow took over her father's factory. This is the cause for Cynthia's intense hatred of Mona. In the episode "Mr Perky Pentangle" Cynthia does try to get back into Pentangle's by trying to retrieve the missing owl mascot. Unlike most of the other characters, Cynthia is mostly referred to by her surname. Played by Daisy Hughes.
 Dyllis Mustardseed – Dyllis Mustardseed is an up beat, though shy character in the series. In the episode "Truth or Lies" she uses a spell to increase her popularity. In the episode "Mr Perky Pentangle" she assists Hettie's help in all of the end-of-year projects. It is during the broomstick-flying test that she discovers the missing owl mascot from Pentangle's. Within the second series she comes to her own as her character increases. Played by Narisha Lawson.
 Roseanne Speedwell – A minor character similar to Dyllis Mustardseed in personality. She has frizzy hair. In the episode "The Levitating Boomerang Broomstick" she can be seen cheerleading. Played by Dominique Jackson.
 Miss Cackle – The headmistress of Cackle's. She is addicted to cream cakes and is much kinder and tolerant than Miss Hardbroom. She previously appeared in The Worst Witch, played by Clare Coulter, the only regular cast member from The Worst Witch to reprise her role in The New Worst Witch on a full-time basis.
 Miss Hardbroom – The strict deputy head/potions teacher of Cackle's. She is stricter and firmer than Miss Cackle, dislikes Hettie and favours Belladonna and Cynthia. She previously appeared in The Worst Witch, played by Caroline O'Neill. 
 Miss Nightingale – Miss Nightingale is the passionate and dramatic art teacher of Cackle's who replaces Miss Bat/Miss Crotchet after The Worst Witch. Nightingale is played by Indra Ové, but is replaced by Miss Widget after the first series, though Miss Nightingale's absence in the second series is unexplained.
 Miss Widget – Miss Widget is the eccentric and passionate art teacher who replaces Miss Nightingale in the second series after Miss Nightingale's unexplained departure at the end of the first series. She is played by Elizabeth Bower.
 Miss Swoop – The PE teacher. She previously appeared in Weirdsister College and an episode of the original series "The Witchy Hour". She previously attended Pentangle's Academy, though in both of Miss Pentangle's appearances ("The Visitors" and "Mr. Perky Pentangle") Miss Pentangle acts as if she's a stranger. Played by Stephanie Lane.
 Caspian Bloom – The librarian at Cackle's who replaces Mr. Blossom the handyman. He is addicted to doughnuts and sleeps a lot. In the episode "Mr. Perky Pentangle" he makes Belladonna short-sighted as payback for Belladonna calling him blind. In the final episode, "The Odd Couple", both Miss Swoop and Miss Widget fall in love with him after they both accidentally drink Mona's love potion.

Episodes

Series overview

Series 1 (2005)

Series 2 (2006–2007)

Cancellation

In 2006, Alice Connor who played Henrietta Hubble decided not to renew her contract for a third season as well as a few other cast members as they began to age and they were becoming more interested in pursuing other roles despite the series being expected to return for another season.

References

External links

2000s British children's television series
2005 British television series debuts
2007 British television series endings
2000s Canadian children's television series
2005 Canadian television series debuts
2007 Canadian television series endings
British supernatural television shows
ITV children's television shows
English-language television shows
Witchcraft in television
The Worst Witch
Television about magic
Television series about teenagers
Television shows set in Lancashire
British children's fantasy television series
Canadian television spin-offs
British television spin-offs